Too Good To Go is a service with a mobile application that connects customers to restaurants and stores that have surplus unsold food. The service covers major European cities, and in October 2020, started operations in North America. As part of the initiatives taken on the International Day of Awareness of Food Loss and Waste to reduce food loss and waste, the app is suggested alongside OLIO among many others.

In 2022 Too Good To Go was the fastest-growing sustainable food app startup by number of  downloads. As of August 2022, it claims 164,000 businesses, serving 62 million users, have saved 155 million bags of food.

History 

The company was created in 2015 in Denmark by Brian Christensen, Thomas Bjørn Momsen, Stian Olesen, Klaus Bagge Pedersen, and Adam Sigbrand. In 2017, Mette Lykke (co-founder of Endomondo) joined as CEO.

The application was co-founded in Switzerland and Austria by Jörgen Munter, in France by Lucie Basch, and in the United Kingdom by Chris Wilson and Jamie Crummie. 

In February 2019, the company raised an additional 6 million euros in a new round investment. In August 2019, Too Good To Go was re-launched in Austria. In September 2019, Too Good To Go acquired the Spanish startup weSAVEeat and merged it into its own brand. In November 2019, the offer of Too Good To Go extended to plants through a partnership with the French retail plants company Jardiland. In December 2019, Too Good To Go partnered with the French grocery retail stores Intermarché, and donated 60K euros to the French charity Restaurants du Cœur. In October 2021, Bonnie Wright teamed up with Too Good To Go to drive the initiative to reduce food waste.

Purpose

The purpose of Too Good To Go is to reduce food waste worldwide. It developed a mobile application that connects restaurants and stores that have unsold, surplus food, with customers who can then buy whatever food the outlet considers surplus to requirements — without being able to choose — at a much lower price than normal. The food on the app is priced at one-third its original price. The company claims this reduces the waste of food that would otherwise be discarded; food waste is a global problem that affects the environment. In three years active, the app reached more than 9.5 million users. As of 2022, more than 57.7 million users and 154,000 establishments have signed up, and 139 million meals have been collected.

In 2019, the company had 350 employees in Europe. As of August 2022 the company was estimated to have 1,345 employees.

Use
Food outlets must notify the TGTG company about what they have available on each day, stating what sort of food they have (baked foods, meals, produce, vegan food), and the price for a 'magic bag', whose contents they determine; the user cannot choose, but the original prices will be three or more times the TGTG price. Notification is made early based upon the quantity predicted to be left over, not at the end of a selling period.

Users must register to use the service. A mobile phone with an Internet connection running Android or iOS is needed. The user runs the TGTG app, which lists outlets available within a chosen distance and time range. The customer can then order and pay for a 'magic bag'. The supplier can cancel an order at any time if the expected surplus is not available — the purchaser is notified by text message — and the purchaser can cancel with two hours' notice. The phone must be taken to the food supplier in a specified pickup time window, often 30 or 60 minutes long, and the transaction is finalised by swiping the app— connected to the Internet — to confirm collection.

References

External links 
 Official website

Food waste
Waste management companies of Denmark
Waste companies established in 2015
Mobile applications
Android (operating system) software
Windows Phone software
BlackBerry software
Web applications
Software companies based in Copenhagen
Danish companies established in 2015